George Wallace is a 1997 biographical two-part mini-series produced and directed by John Frankenheimer and starring Gary Sinise as the titular former Governor of Alabama. The mini-series's teleplay, written by Marshall Frady and Paul Monash, is based on the 1996 biography Wallace: The Classic Portrait of Alabama Governor George Wallace by Frady. Mare Winningham, Clarence Williams III, Joe Don Baker, Angelina Jolie, Terry Kinney, William Sanderson, Mark Rolston, Tracy Fraim, Skipp Sudduth, Ron Perkins, and Mark Valley also star.

George Wallace was highly praised by critics and received various accolades: including Emmy Awards for Outstanding Directing (Frankenheimer), Outstanding Lead Actor (Sinise), and Outstanding Supporting Actress (Winningham), and Golden Globes for Best Television Film and Best Supporting Actress (Jolie).

Plot
George Wallace portrays the political life of a complex man. Initially an ordinary Southern judge, Wallace transforms himself to achieve political success and glory, becoming one of the most reviled political figures in the U.S. Finally, a failed assassination attempt which leaves him paralyzed and in pain leads him to realize what he has become.

The film follows the story of Wallace's life from the 1950s, when he was a circuit court judge in Barbour County, to his tenure as the most powerful Governor in Alabama's history. The movie depicts his symbolic "Stand in the Schoolhouse Door", where Wallace attempted to block black students from entering the University of Alabama. It details his stance on racial segregation in Alabama at the time, which proved popular with his white constituents, and also depicts Wallace's rise as a presidential hopeful. This eventually leads to his surprise victory in several states during the 1968 Presidential election, followed by his attempted assassination four years later.

Cast
 Gary Sinise as George C. Wallace
 Mare Winningham as Lurleen Wallace
 Clarence Williams III as Archie
 Joe Don Baker as Jim "Big Jim" Folsom
 Angelina Jolie as Cornelia Wallace
 Terry Kinney as Billy Watson
 William Sanderson as T.Y. Odum
 Mark Rolston as Ricky Brickle
 Tracy Fraim as Gerald Wallace
 Skipp Sudduth as Al Lingo
 Ron Perkins as Nicholas Katzenbach
 Mark Valley as US Attorney General Robert F. Kennedy
 Scott Brantley as Arthur Bremer
 Kathryn Erbe as Mrs. Folsom
 Steve Harris as Neal
 Bobby Kirby as James Hood
 Ketema Nelson as Vivian Malone

Reception 
The New York Times Caryn James, wrote that events were "recreated with startling veracity and tension in the two-part mini-series called simply George Wallace." James wrote that Sinise was "amazing" and Mare Winningham was "extraordinary."

Sinise reprised his role as George Wallace in Frankenheimer's 2002 television film Path to War, about the Johnson administration's entry into the Vietnam War.

The Associated Press stated that the film's version of Cornelia Wallace was depicted as "a shallow sex kitten" and therefore Cornelia Wallace had criticism towards the portrayal.

Awards and nominations
1998 American Cinema Editors (Eddies)
 Won - Best Edited Episode from a Television Mini-Series — Antony Gibbs (for part 2)
1998 American Society of Cinematographers
 Won - Outstanding Achievement in Cinematography in Mini-Series — Alan Caso
1998 Art Directors Guild
 Won - Excellence in Production Design Award for a Television Movie or Miniseries — Michael Z. Hanan, Charles M. Lagola, Arlan Jay Vetter
1997 CableACE Award
 Won - Best Actor in a Movie or Miniseries — Gary Sinise
 Won - Best Directing a Movie or Miniseries — John Frankenheimer
 Won - Best Makeup — Janeen Schreyer, John E. Jackson, Matthew W. Mungle, Patricia Androff, Jamie Kelman
 Won - Best Miniseries — Mark Carliner, John Frankenheimer, Julian Krainin, Ethel Winant, Mitch Engel, James Sbardellati
 Nominated - Best Supporting Actor in a Movie or Miniseries — Joe Don Baker
 Nominated - Best Supporting Actress in a Movie or Miniseries — Angelina Jolie
 Nominated - Best Art Direction in a Dramatic Special or Serires/Movie or Miniseries — Michael Z. Hanan, Charles M. Lagola, Douglas A. Mowat
 Nominated - Best Editing a Dramatic Special or Series/Movie or Miniseries — Antony Gibbs
 Nominated - Best Writing a Movie or Miniseries — Paul Monash, Marshall Frady
1998 Casting Society of America (Artios)
 Won - Best Casting for TV Miniseries — Iris Grossman
1998 Directors Guild of America
 Nominated - Outstanding Directorial Achievement in Dramatic Specials — John Frankenheimer
1998 Emmy Awards
 Won - Outstanding Lead Actor in a Miniseries or a Movie — Gary Sinise
 Won - Outstanding Supporting Actress in a Miniseries or a Movie — Mare Winningham
 Won -  Outstanding Directing for a Miniseries or a Movie — John Frankenheimer
 Nominated - Outstanding Supporting Actress in a Miniseries or a Movie — Angelina Jolie
 Nominated - Outstanding Casting for a Miniseries, Movie, or a Special — Iris Grossman
 Nominated - Outstanding Cinematography For A Miniseries Or Movie — Alan Caso
 Nominated - Outstanding Makeup For A Miniseries, Movie Or A Special — Janeen Schreyer, John E. Jackson, Matthew W. Mungle, Patricia Androff, Jamie Kelman, Keith Sayer, Cheryl Nick
 Nominated - Outstanding Miniseries — Mark Carliner, John Frankenheimer, Julian Krainin, Ethel Winant, Mitch Engel, James Sbardellati
1998 Golden Globe Awards
 Won - Best Supporting Actress - Series, Mini-Series or Motion Picture Made for Television — Angelina Jolie
 Won - Best Mini-Series or Motion Picture Made for Television
 Nominated - Best Actor - Mini-Series or Motion Picture Made for Television — Gary Sinise
 Nominated - Best Supporting Actress - Series, Mini-Series or Motion Picture Made for Television — Mare Winningham
1998 Humanitas Prize
 Won - PBS/Cable Category — Marshall Frady, Paul Monash
1998 Motion Picture Sound Editors (Golden Reel Award)
 Nominated - Best Sound Editing - Television Mini-Series - Effects and Foley — Brady Schwartz
1997 Peabody Award
 Won - Peabody Award — Mark Carliner
1998 Screen Actors Guild Awards
 Won - Outstanding Performance by a Male Actor in a TV Movie or Miniseries — Gary Sinise
 Nominated - Outstanding Performance by a Female Actor in a TV Movie or Miniseries — Mare Winningham
1998 Writers Guild of America Awards
 Nominated - Best Screenplay Adapted Long Form — Paul Monash, Marshall Frady

See also
 Civil rights movement in popular culture

References

External links
 

1997 television films
1997 films
TNT Network original films
American biographical drama films
1990s biographical drama films
American biographical series
Films about paraplegics or quadriplegics
Films based on biographies
Films set in 1955
Films set in 1958
Films set in 1963
Films set in 1967
Films set in 1970
Films set in 1972
Films set in 1974
Films set in Alabama
Films set in Massachusetts
Films directed by John Frankenheimer
1990s English-language films
Peabody Award-winning broadcasts
Primetime Emmy Award-winning television series
Best Miniseries or Television Movie Golden Globe winners
George Wallace
American drama television films
1990s American films